Igor Shkaberin (born 2 March 1963) is a Soviet rower. He competed in the men's eight event at the 1992 Summer Olympics.

References

1963 births
Living people
Soviet male rowers
Olympic rowers of the Unified Team
Rowers at the 1992 Summer Olympics
Place of birth missing (living people)